Dil Chahta Hai is a 2001 Indian Hindi-language coming-of-age comedy-drama written and directed by Farhan Akhtar, and produced by Ritesh Sidhwani under Excel Entertainment. Depicting the routine life of Indian affluent youth, it focuses on a transition period in the romantic lives of three college-graduate friends (Aamir Khan, Saif Ali Khan, and Akshaye Khanna). The film also stars Preity Zinta, Sonali Kulkarni, and Dimple Kapadia. The soundtrack was composed by the trio Shankar–Ehsaan–Loy, with lyrics from Javed Akhtar. Farah Khan was the choreographer, and A. Sreekar Prasad was the editor.

Although the film succeeded commercially in metropolitan areas, it did not do so among rural audiences due to the city-oriented lifestyle depicted in the film.

Dil Chahta Hai won 26 awards out of 53 nominations; the direction, the performances of the cast, the story, and the screenplay garnered the most attention from various award groups. At the 49th National Film Awards, the film received two trophies including Best Feature Film in Hindi. It was nominated in thirteen categories at the 47th Filmfare Awards, including Best Film, Best Director (Farhan Akhtar), Best Actor (Aamir Khan), and won seven, including Best Film (Critics), Best Supporting Actor (Khanna), and Best Comedian (Saif Ali Khan). Dil Chahta Hai garnered four awards in the third iteration of the International Indian Film Academy Awards, including Best Supporting Actor (Saif Ali Khan). Among other wins, it also won three Bollywood Movie Awards, eight Screen Awards, and two Zee Cine Awards.

Awards and nominations

Notes

References

External links 
 Accolades received by Dil Chahta Hai at IMDb

Dil Chahta Hai